Fimbristylis denudata is a sedge of the family Cyperaceae that is native to Australia.

It blooms between May and October and produces green-brown flowers.

In Western Australia it is found on floodplains and along creeks and streams in the Kimberley region.

References

Plants described in 1810
Flora of Western Australia
denudata
Taxa named by Robert Brown (botanist, born 1773)